is a Japanese manga series written and illustrated by Hitoshi Shioya. It features short stories about dinosaurs in humorous situations. It is unique for featuring chapters only 7 or 8 pages long. It started publication in 2004, while the first (and only) volume was published in Japan in 2006, and is published in Japan by Poplar Publishing. Viz Media has released this volume in English as well. The English release was reviewed by About.com, KidsReads, Blogcritics, and Midwest Book Review.

References

External links
Frances Liddell's memo on designing the cover
Viz Media

2006 manga
Comedy anime and manga
Shōnen manga
Viz Media manga